Priscilla Innocentia Lungile Mamba (born 4 January 1972) is a Swaziland athlete. She competed for Swaziland at the 2000 Summer Olympics in the Women's 5000 metres event. She finished 16th of 17 competitors in her heat and did not advance to the final. She also competed at the 1991, 1999 and the 2003 World Championships.

References

External links

1972 births
Living people
Swazi female long-distance runners
World Athletics Championships athletes for Eswatini
Olympic athletes of Eswatini
Athletes (track and field) at the 2000 Summer Olympics